"Faces" is the final single released from Run-D.M.C.'s fifth studio album, Back from Hell. It was released on March 11, 1991, by Profile Records and was produced by Jam Master Jay. "Faces" peaked at number 57 on the Billboard Hot R&B Singles chart and number 13 on the Hot Rap Singles chart.

Track listing

A-side
"Faces" (album version) – 4:27 
"Faces" (instrumental) – 5:00

B-side
"Back from Hell" (Remix) – 5:00 (Featuring Chuck D, Ice Cube)  
"Back from Hell" (Remix) (instrumental) – 4:38

1990 songs
1991 singles
Run-DMC songs
Profile Records singles
Songs written by Joseph Simmons
Songs written by Darryl McDaniels
Songs written by Jam Master Jay